Brian Dick (born 11 February 1953) is a Canadian rower. He competed in the men's coxless four event at the 1976 Summer Olympics.

References

1953 births
Living people
Canadian male rowers
Olympic rowers of Canada
Rowers at the 1976 Summer Olympics
Rowers from St. Catharines
Pan American Games medalists in rowing
Pan American Games gold medalists for Canada
Rowers at the 1975 Pan American Games
Rowers at the 1979 Pan American Games
20th-century Canadian people